Stalk-eyed flies (family Diopsidae) comprises around 150 species.

Species list 

Genus Centrioncus
 Centrioncus aberrans
 Centrioncus angusticercus
 Centrioncus bytebieri
 Centrioncus decellei
 Centrioncus decoronotus
 Centrioncus jacobae
 Centrioncus prodiopsis
Genus Cladodiopsis
 Cladodiopsis leptophylla
 Cladodiopsis seyrigi
 Cladodiopsis sicardi
Genus Cyrtodiopsis
 Cyrtodiopsis concava
 Cyrtodiopsis plauta
Genus Diasemopsis
 Diasemopsis aethiopica
 Diasemopsis albifacies
 Diasemopsis amora
 Diasemopsis apicifasciata
 Diasemopsis comoroensis
 Diasemopsis concolor
 Diasemopsis coniortodes
 Diasemopsis conjuncta
 Diasemopsis dejecta
 Diasemopsis disconcerta
 Diasemopsis dubia
 Diasemopsis elegantula
 Diasemopsis elongata
 Diasemopsis exquisita
 Diasemopsis fasciata
 Diasemopsis fusca
 Diasemopsis fuscapicis
 Diasemopsis fuscivenis
 Diasemopsis hirsuta
 Diasemopsis hirta
 Diasemopsis horni
 Diasemopsis incerta
 Diasemopsis interrupta
 Diasemopsis jeanneli
 Diasemopsis jillyi
 Diasemopsis latifascia
 Diasemopsis longipedunculata
 Diasemopsis meigenii
 Diasemopsis minuta
 Diasemopsis munroi
 Diasemopsis nebulosa
 Diasemopsis obscura
 Diasemopsis obstans
 Diasemopsis pleuritica
 Diasemopsis pulchella
 Diasemopsis quadrata
 Diasemopsis robusta
 Diasemopsis sexnotata
 Diasemopsis siderata
 Diasemopsis signata
 Diasemopsis silvatica
 Diasemopsis subfuscata
 Diasemopsis thaxteri
 Diasemopsis thomyris
 Diasemopsis wolteri
Genus Diopsina
 Diopsina draconigena
 Diopsina ferruginea
 Diopsina intermedia
 Diopsina kwaipai
 Diopsina nitida
 Diopsina schulteni
Genus Diopsis
 Diopsis abdominalis
 Diopsis absens
 Diopsis acanthophthalma
 Diopsis angustifemur
 Diopsis anthracina
 Diopsis apicalis
 Diopsis arabica
 Diopsis aries
 Diopsis atricapilla
 Diopsis atromicans
 Diopsis baigumensis
 Diopsis basalis
 Diopsis circularis
 Diopsis collaris
 Diopsis confusa
 Diopsis cruciata
 Diopsis curva
 Diopsis dimidiata
 Diopsis diversipes
 Diopsis eisentrauti
 Diopsis erythrocephala
 Diopsis finitima
 Diopsis flavoscutellaris
 Diopsis fumipennis
 Diopsis furcata
 Diopsis globosa
 Diopsis gnu
 Diopsis hoplophora
 Diopsis ichneumonea
 Diopsis indica
 Diopsis leucochira
 Diopsis lindneri
 Diopsis macquartii
 Diopsis macromacula
 Diopsis macrophthalma
 Diopsis maculithorax
 Diopsis melania
 Diopsis micronotata
 Diopsis munroi
 Diopsis neesii
 Diopsis nigra
 Diopsis nigrasplendens
 Diopsis nigriceps
 Diopsis nigrosicus
 Diopsis nitela
 Diopsis orizae
 Diopsis ornata
 Diopsis phlogodes
 Diopsis planidorsum
 Diopsis pollinosa
 Diopsis preapicalis
 Diopsis punctigera
 Diopsis rubriceps
 Diopsis servillei
 Diopsis somaliensis
 Diopsis stuckenbergi
 Diopsis subfasciata
 Diopsis sulcifrons
 Diopsis surcoufi
 Diopsis terminata
 Diopsis trentepohlii
 Diopsis wiedemanni
Genus Eosiopsis
 Eosiopsis orientalis
 Eosiopsis pumila
 Eosiopsis sinensis
Genus Eurydiopsis
 Eurydiopsis brevispinus
 Eurydiopsis glabrostylus
 Eurydiopsis helsdingeni
 Eurydiopsis pachya
 Eurydiopsis porphyria
 Eurydiopsis pseudohelsdingeni
 Eurydiopsis sarawakensis
 Eurydiopsis subnotata
Genus Pseudodiopsis
 Pseudodiopsis bipunctipennis
 Pseudodiopsis detrahens
Genus Sphyracephala
 Sphyracephala beccarii
 Sphyracephala brevicornis
 Sphyracephala europaea
 Sphyracephala hearseiana
 Sphyracephala munroi
 Sphyracephala subbifasciata
Genus Teleopsis
 Teleopsis adjacens
 Teleopsis africana
 Teleopsis anjahanaribei
 Teleopsis apographica
 Teleopsis apollo
 Teleopsis boettcheri
 Teleopsis currani
 Teleopsis dalmanni
 Teleopsis discrepans
 Teleopsis fallax
 Teleopsis ferruginea
 Teleopsis fulviventris
 Teleopsis krombeini
 Teleopsis maculata
 Teleopsis motatrix
 Teleopsis onopyxus
 Teleopsis orientalis
 Teleopsis pharao
 Teleopsis quadriguttata
 Teleopsis quinqueguttata
 Teleopsis rubicunda
 Teleopsis selecta
 Teleopsis sexguttata
 Teleopsis shillitoi
 Teleopsis sinensis
 Teleopsis sykesii
 Teleopsis thaii
 Teleopsis trichophoras
 Teleopsis vadoni
 Teleopsis whitei
Genus Teloglabrus
 Teloglabrus australis
 Teloglabrus curvipes
 Teloglabrus duplospinosus
 Teloglabrus entabensis
 Teloglabrus lebombensis
 Teloglabrus londti
 Teloglabrus milleri
 Teloglabrus pelecyformis
 Teloglabrus prolongatus
 Teloglabrus sabiensis
 Teloglabrus sanorum
 Teloglabrus stuckenbergi
 Teloglabrus trituberculatus
 Teloglabrus tsitsikamensis
 Teloglabrus vumbensis

References

 
Stalk-eyed flies